Neško Milovanović (born 4 December 1974) is a football manager and former player. Manager of FC Slivnishki geroi.

Born in Serbia, he gained Bulgarian citizenship in the early 2000s.

Playing career
During his playing career, Milovanović represented numerous clubs in his homeland and abroad, most notably Borac Čačak, Radnički Kragujevac, Levski Sofia, and Lokomotiv Plovdiv. He won the Bulgarian national championship with Levski Sofia in 2000 and 2001, as well as with Lokomotiv Plovdiv in 2004. Milovanović also lifted the Bulgarian Cup with the former in 2000. Previously, Milovanović briefly played indoor soccer with the Baltimore Spirit of the National Professional Soccer League in the 1996–97 season.

Managerial career
After hanging up his boots, Milovanović was manager of numerous clubs, including Mladost Lučani, Sloga Kraljevo, Radnik Surdulica (two spells), Radnički Kragujevac, and Novi Pazar.

On 8 February 2019, Milovanović was re-appointed as manager of Novi Pazar. He resigned from his position by mutual consent on 11 April 2019.

Personal life
Milovanović is the father of Vasilije Veljko Milovanović.

Honours
Levski Sofia
 Bulgarian First League: 1999–2000, 2000–2001
 Bulgarian Cup: 2000
Lokomotiv Plovdiv
 Bulgarian First League: 2003–04

References

External links
 Srbijafudbal profile
 Levski Sofia profile
 Just Sports Stats profile
 

Association football forwards
Baltimore Spirit players
First Professional Football League (Bulgaria) players
Bulgarian people of Serbian descent
Expatriate footballers in Bulgaria
Expatriate footballers in China
Expatriate footballers in Greece
Expatriate footballers in Japan
Expatriate footballers in Malta
Expatriate soccer players in the United States
First League of Serbia and Montenegro players
FK Borac Čačak players
FK Milicionar players
FK Novi Pazar managers
FK Obilić players
FK Radnički 1923 managers
FK Radnički 1923 players
FK Radnički Niš players
Football League (Greece) players
J1 League players
Maltese Premier League players
National Professional Soccer League (1984–2001) players
Naturalised citizens of Bulgaria
Olympiacos Volos F.C. players
Panserraikos F.C. players
PFC Belasitsa Petrich players
PFC Levski Sofia players
PFC Lokomotiv Plovdiv players
Sanfrecce Hiroshima players
Serbian expatriate footballers
Serbian expatriate sportspeople in Bulgaria
Serbian expatriate sportspeople in China
Serbian expatriate sportspeople in Greece
Serbian expatriate sportspeople in Japan
Serbian expatriate sportspeople in Malta
Serbian expatriate sportspeople in the United States
Serbian First League players
Serbian footballers
Serbian SuperLiga managers
Serbian SuperLiga players
Shanghai Shenhua F.C. players
Sliema Wanderers F.C. players
Sportspeople from Čačak
1974 births
Living people
Bulgarian football managers
FK Mladost Lučani managers